Michael Raymond Donald Ashley  (born 1948) is a British bibliographer, author and editor of science fiction, mystery, and fantasy.

He edits the long-running Mammoth Book series of short story anthologies, each arranged around a particular theme in mystery, fantasy, or science fiction. He has a special interest in fiction magazines and has written a multi-volume History of the Science Fiction Magazine and a study of British fiction magazines, The Age of the Storytellers. He won the Edgar Award for The Mammoth Encyclopedia of Modern Crime Fiction. In addition to the books listed below he edited and prepared for publication the novel The Enchantresses (1997) by Vera Chapman. He has contributed to many reference works including The Encyclopedia of Fantasy (as Contributing Editor) and The Encyclopedia of Science Fiction (as Contributing Editor of the third edition). He wrote the books to accompany the British Library's exhibitions, Taking Liberties in 2008 and Out of This World: Science Fiction But Not As You Know It in 2011.

He lives in Chatham, Kent, England.

Bibliography

Anthologies
Souls in Metal: an Anthology of Robot Futures (1977)
 
Weird Legacies (1977)
SF Choice '77 (1977)
The Best of British SF in 2 volumes (1977)
Mrs. Gaskell's Tales of Mystery and Horror (1978)
Jewels of Wonder (1981)
Algernon Blackwood's Tales of the Supernatural (1983)
Crypt of Cthulhu #62 (1989). Guest edited special issue dedicated to Robert A. W. Lowndes.
Robert E. Howard's World of Heroes (1989)
The Magic Mirror: Lost Supernatural and Mystery Stories by Algernon Blackwood (1989)
When Spirits Talk (1990)
The Giant Book of Myths and Legends (1995)
Classical Stories (1996). Revised and expanded as The Giant Book of Heroic Adventure Stories (1997)
Classical Whodunnits: Murder And Mystery from Ancient Greece And Rome (1996)
Space Stories (1996). Published in the US as The Random House Book of Science Fiction Stories (1997) 
Fantasy Stories (1996). Published in the US as The Random House Book of Fantasy Stories (1997) 
Shakespearean Whodunnits (1997)
Shakespearean Detectives (1998)
Royal Whodunnits: Tales of Right, Royal Murder And Mystery (1999)
Phantom Perfumes and Other Shades: Memories of Ghost Stories Magazine (2000)
A Haunting Beauty (2000). Collection of stories by Charles Birkin.
The Merriest Knight: The Collected Arthurian Tales of Theodore Goodridge Roberts (2001)
The Mirror and Other Strange Reflections (2002). Collection of stories by Arthur Porges.
Thing of Darkness (2006). Collection of stories by G. G. Pendarves compiled with John Pelan.
Great American Ghost Stories (2008)
Unforgettable Ghost Stories by Women Writers (2008)
Dreams and Wonders: Stories from the Dawn of Modern Fantasy (August 2010)
The Duel of Shadows: The Extraordinary Cases of Barnabas Hildreth (2011) by Vincent Cornier
Fighters of Fear: Occult Detective Stories (2020)

British Library of Science Fiction Classics
Lost Mars: Stories from the Golden Age of the Red Planet (University of Chicago Press, 2018)
Moonrise: The Golden Age of Lunar Adventures (2018)
Menace of the Machine: The Rise of AI in Classic Science Fiction (2019)
Menace of the Monster: Classic Tales of Creatures from Beyond (2019)
The End of the World: and Other Catastrophes (2019)
The Darkest of Nights (2019)
The Tide Went Out (2019)
Beyond Time: Classic Tales of Time Unwound (2019)
Yesterday's Tomorrows: The Story of Science Fiction in 100 Books (2021)
The Society of Time: The Original Trilogy and Other Stories (2021)
Spaceworlds: Stories of Life in the Void (2021)
Nature's Warnings: Classic Stories of Eco-Science Fiction (2021)
Born of the Sun: Adventures in Our Solar System (2021)

Tales of the Weird
Glimpses of the Unknown: Lost Ghost Stories (2019)
From the Depths: And Other Strange Tales of the Sea (2019)
The Platform Edge: Uncanny Tales of the Railways (2019)
Doorway to Dilemma: Bewildering Tales of Dark (2019)
Queens of the Abyss: Lost Stories from the Women of the Weird (2020)
The Outcast: And Other Dark Tales by E. F. Benson (2020)

Arthurian anthologies
The Pendragon Chronicles: Heroic Fantasy from the Time of King Arthur (1990)
The Camelot Chronicles: Heroic Adventures from the Time of King Arthur (1992)
The Merlin Chronicles (1995)
Chronicles of the Holy Grail (1996). Also published as Quest for the Holy Grail (1997).
The Chronicles of the Round Table (1997).  Also published as Tales of the Round Table (1997).

The Mammoth Book of ... series 
The Mammoth Book of Short Horror Novels (1988)
The Mammoth Book of Historical Whodunnits (1993)
The Mammoth Book of Historical Detectives (1995)
The Mammoth Book of Fairy Tales (1997)
The Mammoth Book of New Sherlock Holmes Adventures (1997) 
The Mammoth Book of Comic Fantasy (1998)
The Mammoth Book of Arthurian Legends (1998)
The Mammoth Book of British Kings and Queens (1998) This was the US title for British Monarchs
The Mammoth Book of Men o' War (1999)
The Mammoth Book of Seriously Comic Fantasy (1999). Published in the US as The Mammoth Book of Comic Fantasy II
The Mammoth Book of Sword and Honor (2000) 
The Mammoth Book of Locked Room Mysteries and Impossible Crimes (2000)
The Mammoth Book of Awesome Comic Fantasy (2001)
The Mammoth Book of Hearts of Oak (2001). Published in the US as The Mammoth Book of Sea Battles (2001)
The Mammoth Book of Historical Whodunnits (Volume 2) (2001). Published in the US as The Mammoth Book of More Historical Whodunnits
The Mammoth Book of Fantasy (2001)
The Mammoth Book of Science Fiction (2002)
The Mammoth Encyclopedia of Modern Crime Fiction (2002)
The Mammoth Book of Egyptian Whodunnits (2002)
The Mammoth Book of Roman Whodunnits (2003)
The Mammoth Book of Roaring Twenties Whodunnits (2004)
The Mammoth Book of Sorcerer's Tales (2004)
The Mammoth Book of Comic Fantasy (2005)
The Mammoth Book of New Jules Verne Adventures (2005) (with Eric Brown)
The Mammoth Book of King Arthur (2005)
The Mammoth Book of Historical Whodunnits: Third New Collection (2005). Published in the US as The Mammoth Book of New Historical Whodunnits (2005)
The Mammoth Book of Comic Fantasy: Fourth All-New Collection(2005). Published in the US as The Mammoth Book of New Comic Fantasy 
The Mammoth Book of Extreme Science Fiction (2006)
The Mammoth Book of Jacobean Whodunnits (2006)
The Mammoth Book of Perfect Crimes and Impossible Mysteries (2006)
The Mammoth Book of Dickensian Whodunnits (2007)
The Mammoth Book of Extreme Fantasy (2008)
The Mammoth Book of Mindblowing SF (2009). Notably criticised for featuring only works by white men.
The Mammoth Book of Time Travel SF (2013)

See also The History of the Science Fiction Magazines series below.

Non-fiction

Who's Who in Horror and Fantasy Fiction (1977)
Fantasy Readers' Guide No. 1: The John Spencer Fantasy Publications (1979)
The Seven Wonders of the World (1979)
Fantasy Readers' Guide No. 2: The File on Ramsey Campbell (1980)
The Complete Index to Astounding/Analog (1981)
The Writings of Barrington J. Bayley (1981)
The Illustrated Book of Science Fiction Lists (1982)
Monthly Terrors (1985) (with Frank H. Parnell)
Science Fiction, Fantasy and Weird Fiction Magazines (1985) (with Marshall B. Tymn)
Algernon Blackwood: A Bio-Bibliography (1987)*
The Work of William F. Temple (1994)
The Supernatural Index (1995) (with William G. Contento)
The Life and Times of King Arthur (1996)
British Monarchs (1998). Published in the US as The Mammoth Book of British Kings and Queens. Subsequently edited and reissued as A Brief History of British Kings and Queens (2002)
 
Starlight Man: The Extraordinary Life of Algernon Blackwood (2001). Published in the US as Algernon Blackwood: An Extraordinary Life.
The Gernsback Days: The Evolution of Modern Science Fiction from 1911–1936 (2004) (with Robert A. W. Lowndes)
The Age of the Story Tellers: British Popular Fiction Magazines 1880–1950 (2006)
Taking Liberties (2008)
Out of This World: Science Fiction But Not As You Know It (2011)
 

The History of the Science Fiction Magazines series

Reprint anthologies with commentary:
The History of the Science Fiction Magazine, Part One: 1926–1935 (1974)
The History of the Science Fiction Magazine, Part Two: 1936–1945 (1975)
The History of the Science Fiction Magazine, Part Three: 1946–1955 (1976)
The History of the Science Fiction Magazine, Part Four: 1956–1965 (1978)

Later, revised and expanded as reference works (without the stories):
The Time Machines. The Story of the Science-Fiction Pulp Magazines from the Beginning to 1950 (2000)
Transformations. The Story of the Science Fiction Magazines from 1950 to 1970 (2005)
Gateways to Forever. The Story of the Science-Fiction Magazines from 1970 to 1980 (2007)
Science Fiction Rebels: The Story of the Science-Fiction Magazines from 1981 to 1990 (2016)

Smarties series
All the Incredible Facts You Ever Need to Know (1999). Later split into two books as Wacky World (2001) and Hairy Humans (2001)
Incredible Monsters (2000). Later split into two books as Beautiful Beasties (2001) and Deadly Dinosaurs (2001)

References

External links

"Mike Ashley: researching the fantastic: an interview by Iain Rowan"
"Starlight, Jelly and Shadows, Mike Ashley: interviewed by Andrew Hedgecock"
Mike Ashley at Fantastic Fiction
The Encyclopedia of Science Fiction, 3rd ed. 

 

1948 births
Living people
20th-century British male writers
20th-century British writers
20th-century British novelists
21st-century British male writers
21st-century British novelists
Analog Science Fiction and Fact people
British fantasy writers
British male novelists
British non-fiction writers
British science fiction writers
British speculative fiction editors
Edgar Award winners
The Magazine of Fantasy & Science Fiction people
Male non-fiction writers
Weird fiction writers